{{Automatic taxobox
| name = Maytenus sp. nov. A
| image = 
| status = VU
| status_system = IUCN3.1
| status_ref = 
| taxon = Maytenus
| species_text = M. sp. nov. A| binomial_text = Maytenus sp. nov. A
| authority = Miller
| synonyms = 
}}Maytenus sp. nov. A is a species of plant in the family Celastraceae. It is endemic to Yemen.  Its natural habitats are subtropical or tropical dry forest and rocky areas.

References

sp. nov. A
Endemic flora of Socotra
Vulnerable flora of Africa
Vulnerable flora of Asia
Undescribed plant species
Taxonomy articles created by Polbot